Lara Amersey (born November 13, 1984) is a Canadian actress. She is known for her roles in Life with Derek, Overruled, Monster Warriors and Land of the Dead.

Life and career
Lara was born in 1984 and relocated with her family to Toronto, Ontario in 1991. In 2003, Lara got involved in the film industry and got her break in a Stridex commercial. Following that, she appeared in many other commercials including ads for 7Up, Coca-Cola and American Express. The following year she landed a role on the hit kids show Radio Free Roscoe which helped to start her career as an actress and is still the series that she is most recognized for. Since then, she has guest starred in shows such as Life with Derek as Lucy, Overruled as Rory Jablonski, as well as short films Hate, Rose, and Red Velvet Girls as well as the feature film Land of the Dead. Her most recent work includes episodes of Warehouse 13 and Flashpoint.

Lara's most memorable work to date has been her leading role on the television series Monster Warriors. She starred as Vanka, an athletic, aggressive, overpowering girl with an interest in ancient combat and rituals. The series has aired all over the world in many different languages.

Lara has expanded her experience behind the camera working closely with Jordan Entertainment as an Associate Producer. She is eager about what the future holds for her as an actress as well as her future within Jordan Entertainment.

Filmography

External links
 

1984 births
Living people
Actresses from Montreal
Anglophone Quebec people
Canadian television actresses
21st-century Canadian actresses
Actresses from Toronto